The Aongatete River or Aongatete Stream is a river of New Zealand. It flows northwest from the Kaimai Ranges to enter Tauranga Harbour to the south of Katikati.

See also
 List of rivers of New Zealand

References
 

Rivers of the Bay of Plenty Region
Rivers of New Zealand